Jeff D. Gautier (born March 2, 1935) is a politician and lawyer in the American state of Florida. He served in the Florida House of Representatives. He first got elected in 1966 to the dade district, which he served until 1967 which eventually got abolished and was redistricted to the 103rd district. He served the 103rd district from 1967 - 1968, the 109th district from 1968 to 1972 and the 119th district 1972 to 1974.

References

1935 births
Living people
Members of the Florida House of Representatives